Chulaki (also Romanized as Chūlakī and Chūlekī; also known as Chaliki and Chelīkī) is a village in Howmeh-ye Sharqi Rural District, in the Central District of Izeh County, Khuzestan Province, Iran. At the 2006 census, its population was 87, in 14 families.

References 

Populated places in Izeh County